The 2021–22 Melbourne Stars Women's season was the seventh in the team's history. Coached by Jarrad Loughman and captained by Meg Lanning, the Stars were not scheduled to play any WBBL07 games in their home state of Victoria due to ongoing border restrictions related to the COVID-19 pandemic. They finished the regular season in fifth place on the ladder, failing to qualify for the knockout stage of the tournament.

Squad 
Each 2021–22 squad was made up of 15 active players. Teams could sign up to five 'marquee players', with a maximum of three of those from overseas. Marquees were classed as any overseas player, or a local player who holds a Cricket Australia national contract at the start of the WBBL|07 signing period.

Personnel changes made ahead of the season included:

 English marquees Katherine Brunt and Nat Sciver did not re-sign with the Stars in anticipation of a clashing schedule with national team duties.
 South African marquee Mignon du Preez departed the Stars, signing with the Hobart Hurricanes.
 Irish marquee Kim Garth signed with the Stars, having previously played in the league for the Sydney Sixers and Perth Scorchers.
 English marquees Maia Bouchier and Linsey Smith signed with the Stars, marking their first appearances in the league.
 Holly Ferling departed the Stars, signing with the Melbourne Renegades.
 Alana King departed the Stars, signing with the Perth Scorchers.
 Maddy Darke signed with the Stars, departing the Sydney Sixers.
 Jarrad Loughman was appointed head coach, replacing Trent Woodhill.

The table below lists the Stars players and their key stats (including runs scored, batting strike rate, wickets taken, economy rate, catches and stumpings) for the season.

Ladder

Fixtures 

All times are local

Statistics and awards 

 Most runs: Elyse Villani – 439 (4th in the league)
 Highest score in an innings: Elyse Villani – 100* (65) vs Adelaide Strikers, 21 November
 Most wickets: Kim Garth – 15 (equal 9th in the league)
 Best bowling figures in an innings: Kim Garth – 3/11 (4 overs) vs Sydney Thunder, 26 October
 Most catches (fielder): Kim Garth, Linsey Smith – 5 each (equal 16th in the league)
 Player of the Match awards: Tess Flintoff, Kim Garth, Meg Lanning, Annabel Sutherland, Elyse Villani – 1 each
 Stars Player of the Season: Kim Garth

References 

2021–22 Women's Big Bash League season by team
Melbourne Stars (WBBL)